The Queen was an English Channel passenger ferry that was built in 1903 and sunk in 1916. She was the South Eastern and Chatham Railway (SECR)'s first steam turbine ship.

In 1908 The Queen was damaged in a collision with another SECR ferry. Early in the First World War she was a troop ship. In 1916 she was captured by one German destroyer and then sunk by another.

Building
William Denny and Brothers built The Queen at Dumbarton as yard number 682. She was launched on 4 April 1903 and completed that June.

She had three propellers, each powered by a Parsons steam turbine.

Identification
The Queens UK official number was 118293 and her code letters were VCPH. By 1913 she was equipped for wireless telegraphy and her call sign was SEQ. In 1914 this was changed to GUN.

History
The Queen entered service on the Dover – Calais route, making her maiden voyage on 27 June 1903. In 1907 she was transferred to the Folkestone – Boulogne route. On 1 June 1908 The Queen and another SECR ferry, collided in thick fog. Both ships were badly damaged.

In 1914 The Queen helped evacuate Belgian refugees from Ostend. She later became a troop ship. On 26 October 1914 she rescued more than 2,000 people from the Chargeurs Réunis ship Amiral Ganteaume, which had been damaged by torpedo. In September 1916 The Queen towed the damaged troop ship Queen Empress to safety.

References

1903 ships
Maritime incidents in 1908
Maritime incidents in 1916
Ships built on the River Clyde
Ships of the South Eastern and Chatham Railway
Steamships of the United Kingdom
World War I passenger ships of the United Kingdom
World War I shipwrecks in the English Channel